The Swallow Airplane Swallow is an American-built general purpose biplane of the mid- to late 1920s.

Development

The Swallow Airplane Manufacturing Co was formed in 1923 to take over the business of the E.M. Laird Aviation Co. of Wichita, Kansas and set up its factory there. In 1924, the New Swallow three-seat biplane was introduced, which differed from the earlier Laird-Swallow in having a cowled engine, split axle undercarriage and single-bay wings. About 50 examples were produced until the design was enhanced in 1926. The initial price was $3,500 reducing to $2,485 in late 1926.

The Swallow OX-5, designed by Waverly Stearman, was introduced in 1927 and was the first Swallow to be built under an official ATC. This used a USA-27 airfoil and cabane N-struts. The Curtiss OX-5 water-cooled engine of the New Swallow was retained. About 250 examples were built.

Whilst in commercial service, many Swallows were fitted with higher powered engines including the 225 hp Wright J-5, and later the Continental R-670.

Operational history

The three-seat Swallow found ready use in the hands of small commercial firms and with the newly founded regional airlines including Varney Air Lines, who used them to carry U.S. mails on the recently created Air Mail routes. After the fitment in later years of more powerful engines, a few remain in service including an example at the Wittman Regional Airport in Oshkosh, Wisconsin which is used for commercial joyriding.

Variants

Source : Aerofiles
New Swallow  90 h.p. Curtiss OX-5, about 50 built 1924-1926
Swallow OX-5  90 h.p. Curtiss OX-5, with USA-27 airfoil and cabane N-struts, about 250 built from 1927
Swallow J-5  225 h.p. Wright J-5, fitted with metal propeller, brakes, larger fuel tank and custom paint. Unknown number built and modified from 1928.
Hisso Swallow  150 hp Hisso A, unknown numbers built from 1928.

Specifications (New Swallow)

See also

Aircraft of comparable role, configuration and era 
(partial listing, only covers most numerous types)

Alexander Eaglerock
American Eagle A-101
Brunner-Winkle Bird
Buhl-Verville CA-3 Airster
Command-Aire 3C3
Parks P-1
Pitcairn Mailwing
Spartan C3
Stearman C2 and C3
Travel Air 2000 and 4000
Waco 10

Related lists 

 List of aircraft
 List of civil aircraft

References

Notes

Bibliography
Aerofiles: Specifications and images of Swallows

1920s United States civil utility aircraft
Biplanes
Single-engined tractor aircraft
Aircraft first flown in 1924
Conventional landing gear